Pablo de Azcárate y Flórez (1890–1971) was a Spanish diplomat. He was born in Madrid. During the 1920s he worked in Minorities Section of the League of Nations Secretariat. During the Spanish Civil War, 
Azcárate served as Ambassador of the Spanish Republican government to London. Following the British recognition of the Nationalist government in early 1939, he went into exile in Switzerland. From 1946 onward, he was attached to the UN. In 1948-1952 he served as secretary of the Consular Truce Commission in Jerusalem on behalf of the UN. Azcárate died in Geneva in 1971.

Azcárate's son, Manuel Azcárate (1916–1998), became one of the leaders of the Spanish Communist Party.

Works
 League of Nations and National Minorities: An Experiment (Carnegie Endowment for International Peace, Washington D.C. 1945)
 Azcarate, Pablo de, Mission in Palestine, 1948-1952 (Washington, DC: Middle East Institute, 1966)

Further reading
 Susan Pedersen, "Back to the League of Nations" The American Historical Review, Vol. 112, No. 4 (October 2007)

Notes

Spanish diplomats
1890 births
1971 deaths
People of the Spanish Civil War